Torino Calcio had a solid season, in which it earned a new contract as a newcomer. The most appreciated player in the squad was right-winger Antonino Asta, who got a late breakthrough at the age of 31, and proved to be the key player as the club stayed above the drop zone by just four points. Marco Ferrante returned from Inter, and scored ten goals, a career best for the experienced striker. The squad also featured the highly rated Swedish striker Yksel Osmanovski, a very young future Italian national team striker in Fabio Quagliarella, and the Turin legend, defender Stefano Fattori.

Squad

Goalkeepers
  Luca Bucci
  Stefano Sorrentino
  Gabriele Paoletti

Defenders
  Luigi Garzya
  Gianluca Comotto
  Daniele Delli Carri
  Giovanni Lopez
  Luca Mezzano
  Riccardo Fissore
  Fabio Galante
  Mirko Cudini
  Ronaldo Vanin
  Alessandro Cibocchi
  Daniele Martinelli
  Paolo Castellini
  Stefano Fattori

Midfielders
  Giorgio Venturin
  Alessio Scarchilli
  Massimo Brambilla
  Antonino Asta
  Franco Semioli
  Benoît Cauet
  Riccardo Maspero
  Diego De Ascentis

Attackers
  Pinga
  José María Franco
  Cristiano Lucarelli
  Yksel Osmanovski
  Fabio Quagliarella
  Paolo Rossi
  Simone Tiribocchi
  Akeem Omoulade
  Emanuele Calaiò
  Marco Ferrante

Serie A

Matches

 Udinese-Torino 2-2
 0-1 Fabio Galante (11)
 0-2 Yksel Osmanovski (43)
 1-2 Roberto Muzzi (63)
 2-2 Carlos Pavón (65)
 Torino-Brescia 1-3
 0-1 Igli Tare (9)
 1-1 Cristiano Lucarelli (30)
 1-2 Igli Tare (68)
 1-3 Roberto Baggio (89 pen)
 Lazio-Torino 0-0
 Torino-Inter 0-1
 0-1 Mohamed Kallon (73 pen)
 Piacenza-Torino 3-1
 1-0 Dario Hübner (9)
 1-1 Cristiano Lucarelli (59)
 2-1 Carmine Gautieri (65)
 3-1 Dario Hübner (87 pen)
 Juventus-Torino 3-3
 1-0 Alessandro Del Piero (9)
 2-0 Igor Tudor (12)
 3-0 Alessandro Del Piero (26)
 3-1 Cristiano Lucarelli (57)
 3-2 Marco Ferrante (70 pen)
 3-3 Riccardo Maspero (83)
 Torino-Perugia 1-0
 1-0 Marco Ferrante (26)
 Chievo-Torino 3-0
 1-0 Massimo Marazzina (31)
 2-0 Christian Manfredini (50)
 3-0 Eriberto (81)
 Torino-Milan 1-0
 1-0 Cristiano Lucarelli (27)
 Fiorentina-Torino 0-0
 Torino-Verona 5-1
 0-1 Adrian Mutu (11)
 1-1 Marco Ferrante (71)
 2-1 Simone Vergassola (75)
 3-1 Fabio Galante (77)
 4-1 Cristiano Lucarelli (86)
 5-1 Marco Ferrante (89)
 Bologna-Torino 1-0
 1-0 Renato Olive (5)
 Torino-Atalanta 1-2
 1-0 Fabio Galante (13)
 1-1 Cristiano Doni (45)
 1-2 Corrado Colombo (69)
 Lecce-Torino 1-1
 1-0 Sebastjan Cimirotič (48)
 1-1 Cristiano Lucarelli (75)
 Torino-Parma 1-0
 1-0 Marco Ferrante (45 + 1)
 Torino-Venezia 1-2
 0-1 Filippo Maniero (15)
 1-1 Gianluca Comotto (64)
 1-2 Filippo Maniero (90)
 Roma-Torino 1-0
 1-0 Francesco Totti (69)
 Torino-Udinese 3-1
 1-0 Cristiano Lucarelli (26 pen)
 1-1 Vincenzo Iaquinta (45)
 2-1 Riccardo Maspero (69)
 3-1 Cristiano Lucarelli (83)
 Brescia-Torino 1-2
 1-0 Andrés Yllana (52)
 1-1 Marco Ferrante (82)
 1-2 Simone Vergassola (87)
 Torino-Lazio 1-0
 1-0 Cristiano Lucarelli (62)
 Inter-Torino 0-0
 Torino-Piacenza 1-1
 0-1 Dario Hübner (73)
 1-1 Marco Ferrante (82)
 Parma-Torino 0-1
 0-1 Gianluca Comotto (88)
 Torino-Juventus 2-2
 0-1 David Trezeguet (10)
 1-1 Marco Ferrante (64)
 2-1 Benoît Cauet (80)
 2-2 Enzo Maresca (89)
 Perugia-Torino 2-0
 1-0 Fabián O'Neill (26)
 2-0 Zisis Vryzas (72)
 Torino-Chievo 2-2
 0-1 Bernardo Corradi (20)
 1-1 Marco Ferrante (35)
 1-2 Bernardo Corradi (53)
 2-2 Riccardo Maspero (59)
 Milan-Torino 2-1
 1-0 Kakha Kaladze (51)
 1-1 Marco Ferrante (64 pen)
 2-1 Massimo Ambrosini (79)
 Torino-Fiorentina 1-0
 1-0 Alessio Scarchilli (24)
 Verona-Torino 0-1
 0-1 José María Franco (26)
 Torino-Bologna 1-1
 1-0 Alessio Scarchilli (19)
 1-1 Julio Cruz (50)
 Atalanta-Torino 1-1
 1-0 Daniele Beretta (15)
 1-1 José María Franco (50)
 Torino-Lecce 1-1
 0-1 Gheorghe Popescu (35)
 1-1 José María Franco (76)
 Venezia-Torino 1-1
 1-0 Filippo Maniero (7 pen)
 1-1 Fabio Galante (90)
 Torino-Roma 0-1
 0-1 Antonio Cassano (68)

Topscorers
  Marco Ferrante 10
  Cristiano Lucarelli 9
  Fabio Galante 4
  Riccardo Maspero 3
  José María Franco 3

References

Sources
  RSSSF - Italy 2001/02

Torino F.C. seasons
Torino